"Start" (stylized as "START") is a song by Japanese singer-songwriter Rina Aiuchi. It was released on 26 May 2004 through Giza Studio, as the second single from her fourth studio album Playgirl. The song reached number eight in Japan and has sold over 42,833 copies nationwide. The song served as the theme song to the Japanese animated series, Case Closed.

Track listing

Charts

Weekly charts

Certification and sales

|-
! scope="row"| Japan (RIAJ)
| 
| 42,833
|-
|}

Release history

References

2004 singles
2004 songs
J-pop songs
Songs written by Aika Ohno
Song recordings produced by Daiko Nagato
Songs written by Rina Aiuchi